Methoxychlor is a synthetic organochloride insecticide, now obsolete.

Usage
Methoxychlor was used to protect crops, ornamentals, livestock, and pets against fleas, mosquitoes, cockroaches, and other insects. It was intended to be a replacement for DDT, but has since been banned for use as a pesticide based on its acute toxicity, bioaccumulation, and endocrine disruption activity.

The amount of methoxychlor in the environment changes seasonally due to its use in farming and foresting. It does not dissolve readily in water, so it is mixed with a petroleum-based fluid and sprayed, or used as a dust. Sprayed methoxychlor settles on the ground or in aquatic ecosystems, where it can be detected in sediments. Its degradation may take many months. Methoxychlor is ingested and absorbed by living organisms, and it accumulates in the food chain. Some metabolites may have unwanted side effects.

Banned
The use of methoxychlor as a pesticide was banned in the United States in 2003 and in the European Union in 2002.

Human exposure
Human exposure to methoxychlor occurs via air, soil, and water, primarily in people who work with the substance or who are exposed to air, soil, or water that has been contaminated. It is unknown how quickly and efficiently the substance is absorbed by humans who have been exposed to contaminated air or via skin contact. In animal models, high doses can lead to neurotoxicity. Some methoxychlor's metabolites have estrogenic effects in adult and developing animals before and after birth. One studied metabolite is 2,2-bis(p-hydroxyphenyl)-1,1,1-trichloroethane (HPTE) which shows reproductive toxicity in an animal model by reducing testosterone biosynthesis. Such effects adversely affect both the male and female reproductive systems. It is expected that this "could occur in humans" but has not been proven. While one study has linked methoxychlor to the development of leukemia in humans, most studies in animals and humans have been negative, thus the EPA has determined that it is not classifiable as a carcinogen. The EPA indicates that levels above the Maximum Contaminant Level of 40 ppb "cause" central nervous depression, diarrhea, damage to liver, kidney, and heart, and - by chronic exposure - growth retardation.

Little information is available regarding effects on human pregnancy and children, but it is assumed from animals studies that methoxychlor crosses the placenta, and it has been detected in human milk Exposure to children may be different than in adults because they tend to play on the ground, further, their reproductive system may be more sensitive to the effects of methoxychlor as an endocrine disruptor.

Food contamination may occur at low levels and it is recommended to wash all foods. A number of hazardous waste sites are known to contain methoxychlor.

Maximum pesticide residue limits for the EU/UK are set at 0.01 mg/kg for oranges and 0.01 mg/kg for apples.

Labeling
The EPA lists methoxychlor as "a persistent, bioaccumulative, and toxic (PBT) chemical by the EPA Toxics Release Inventory (TRI) program", and as such it is a waste minimization priority chemical.

Tradenames for methoxychlor include Chemform, Maralate, Methoxo, Methoxcide, Metox, and Moxie.

See also
Xenoestrogen

References

External links

CDC Report
NIOSH Pocket Guide to Chemical Hazards
EPA Report
Extoxnet
Pubertal Toxicity Study, 2003

Endocrine disruptors
Obsolete pesticides
Organochloride insecticides
Phenol ethers
Trichloromethyl compounds
Xenoestrogens
Bis(4-hydroxyphenyl)methanes